This is a list of cricketers who have represented Karachi Kings in the Pakistan Super League since the 2016 Pakistan Super League. Players are listed alphabetically using the standard naming format of their country of origin followed by the year(s) that they have been active as an Karachi player.

For the list of current players see the current squad.

A
 Aamer Yamin (2019)
 Abdul Ameer (2017)
 Abrar Ahmed (2017; 2019)
 Ali Imran (2019)
 Ammad Alam (2017)
 Mohammad Amir (2016–2019)
 Awais Zia (2019)

B
 Babar Azam (2017–2019)
 Bilawal Bhatti (2016)
 Ravi Bopara (2016–2019)

D
 Danish Aziz (2018)
 Joe Denly (2018)
 Ryan ten Doeschate (2016)
 Ben Dunk (2019)

F
 Fawad Alam (2016)

G
 Chris Gayle (2017)

H
 Mir Hamza (2016)
 Hasan Mohsin (2017–2018)

I
 Iftikhar Ahmed (2016; 2019)
 Imad Wasim (2016–2019)
 Colin Ingram (2018–2019)
 Mohammad Irfan (2018)

J
 Jaahid Ali (2019)
 Mahela Jayawardene (2017)
 Mitchell Johnson (2018)

K
 Kashif Bhatti (2017)
 Khurram Manzoor (2017–2018)

L
 Lendl Simmons (2016; 2018)
 Liam Livingstone (2019)

M
 Ryan McLaren (2017)
 Tymal Mills (2018)
 Mukhtar Ahmed (2018)
 Mushfiqur Rahim (2016)
 Eoin Morgan (2018)
 Colin Munro (2018–2019)

N
 Nauman Anwar (2016)

O
 Owais Shah (2016)

R
 Mohammad Rizwan (2018–2019)

P
 Kieron Pollard (2017)

S
 Saifullah Bangash (2016–2018)
 Kumar Sangakkara (2017)
 Shahzaib Hasan (2016–2017)
 Shakib Al Hasan (2016)
 Shoaib Malik (2016–2017)
 Shahid Afridi (2018)
 Sikandar Raza (2019)
 Sohail Khan (2016–2017; 2019)
 Sohail Tanvir (2016)
 Aaron Summers (2019)

R
 Rahat Ali (2017)

T
 Tabish Khan (2018)
 Talha Ahsan (2022)

U
 Umer Khan (2019)
 Usama Mir (2016–2019)
 Usman Khan (2017–2019)

V
 James Vince (2016)

W
 Riki Wessels (2016)
 David Wiese (2018)
 Luke Wright (2018)

Z
 Zulfiqar Babar (2018)

References

Karachi
Karachi Kings